Reginald Charles Austin Schuman (1909-1974) was an Australian rugby league player who played in the 1920s and 1930s.

Playing career
An Arncliffe Scots junior, Schuman played seven seasons for St. George between 1929–1935. He is remembered as playing prop in the 1930 Grand Final in which St. George were defeated by Western Suburbs 27–2.

Death
Schuman died in Sydney on 2 March 1974, aged 65.

References

St. George Dragons players
Australian rugby league players
1909 births
1974 deaths
Rugby league props
Rugby league locks
Rugby league second-rows